Wielinga is a Dutch surname. Notable people with the surname include:

 Bob Wielinga (1945–2016), Dutch academic 
 Remmert Wielinga (born 1978), Dutch cyclist

Dutch-language surnames